King Jian of Zhou, personal name Ji Yi, was the twenty-second king of the Chinese Zhou dynasty and the tenth of the Eastern Zhou.

Family
Sons:
 Prince Xiexin (d. 545 BC), ruled as King Ling of Zhou from 571 to 545 BC
 A son (d. 545 BC) who was the progenitor of the Dan lineage and the father of Dan Kuo
 Known as Dan Ji

Ancestry

See also
Family tree of ancient Chinese emperors

Sources 

572 BC deaths
Zhou dynasty kings
6th-century BC Chinese monarchs
Year of birth unknown